A. densifolia may refer to:

 Acacia densifolia, a shrub endemic to south-eastern Australia
 Acmadenia densifolia, a flowering plant
 Antennaria densifolia, a perennial plant
 Appendicula densifolia, a flowering plant
 Arundinaria densifolia, a bamboo native to eastern North America
 Asteropeia densifolia, a plant endemic to Madagascar